Gary Independent School District is a public school district based in Gary, Texas (USA).

In 2009, the school district was rated "recognized" by the Texas Education Agency.

References

External links
Gary ISD

School districts in Panola County, Texas